Luis Horacio Gómez González (18 October 1958 – 17 April 2016) was a Roman Catholic bishop.

Ordained to the priesthood in 1991, Gómez González served as bishop of the Apostolic Vicariate of Puerto Gaitán, Colombia from 2014 until 2016.

See also

Notes

1958 births
2016 deaths
21st-century Roman Catholic bishops in Colombia
Roman Catholic bishops of Puerto Gaitán